No Control may refer to:

Film
 No Control (film), a 1927 American film

Music

Albums
 No Control (Bad Religion album) or the title song, 1989
 No Control (Eddie Money album) or the title song, 1982
 No Control (Turbo Fruits album), 2015
 No Control, by Suzi Quatro, 2019

Songs
 "No Control", by 311 from Transistor, 1997
 "No Control", by Atreyu from In Our Wake, 2018
 "No Control", by Blackfire, 2002
 "No Control", by Brand New from Science Fiction, 2017
 "No Control", by Bullet for My Valentine from Bullet for My Valentine, 2004
 "No Control", by David Bowie from Outside, 1995
 "No Control", by One Direction from Four, 2014
 "No Control", by Pepper from No Shame, 2006
 "No Control", by Robert Palmer, B-side of "You Blow Me Away", 1994
 "No Control", by Willow from Coping Mechanism, 2022

See also 
 "No Controles", a 1983 song by Olé Olé, covered by several other performers
 No Controles (album), by Stereo Total, 2009